The eighth season of the Australian competitive cooking competition show My Kitchen Rules premiered on the Seven Network on 30 January 2017.

Applications for contestants opened during the airing of the seventh season. Pete Evans and Manu Feildel returned as hosts, with Colin Fassnidge who was joined by Darren Robertson in the instant restaurant round.

The start date for the season was confirmed in January 2017, and once again debuted the evening following the network's coverage of the Men's Singles final at the 2017 Australian Open.

Four special episodes of The Chase Australia aired featuring eight teams from this season, premiering on 16 February at 7:30pm.

Format changes
Teams – All  18 teams from three groups appeared from the start of the competition. Although there have been the same number of teams in the past, a third group was usually introduced later in the competition.
Special Guest Judges – Two special celebrity guest judges have appeared alongside the main judging panel for some challenges.
Darren Robertson – Joined Colin Fassnidge as judges for Group 3's Instant Restaurant round.
Curtis Stone – Makes his second appearance as a guest judge alongside Pete and Colin during the fourth People's choice challenge.
Instant Restaurant Sudden Death – This season, the two lowest scoring teams from each round competed against each other in a Sudden Death Cook-Off to determine the team to be eliminated.  In previous series, the lowest scoring team at the end of each Instant Restaurant group was immediately eliminated.
Ultimate Instant Restaurants – Eight teams travelled around together in the biggest Instant Restaurant in the show's history.

Teams

Elimination history

Competition details

Instant Restaurants
During the Instant Restaurant rounds, each team hosts a three-course dinner for judges and fellow teams in their allocated group. They are scored and ranked among their group, with the two lowest scoring teams competing in a Sudden Death Cook-Off, where one team is eliminated.

Round 1
 Episodes 1 to 6
 Air date — 30 January to 7 February
 Description — The first of the three instant restaurant groups are introduced into the competition in Round 1. The two lowest scoring teams at the end of this round go through to Sudden Death, where one team is eliminated.

Sudden Death Cook-Off 1
 Episode 7
 Airdate — 8 February
 Description — Being the two bottom scoring teams from Round 1, David & Betty and Bek & Ash will face off in a Sudden Death Cook-Off. The lower scoring team is eliminated.

Round 2
 Episodes 8 to 13
 Airdate — 12 February to 20 February
 Description — The second group now start their Instant Restaurant round. The same rules from the previous round apply and the two lowest scoring teams go to Sudden Death, where one team is eliminated.

Sudden Death Cook-Off 2
 Episode 14
 Airdate — 21 February
 Description — Being the two bottom scoring teams from Round 2, Josh & Amy and Alyse & Matt will compete against each other in a Sudden Death Cook-Off. The lower scoring team is eliminated.

Round 3
 Episodes 15 to 20
 Airdate — 22 February to 5 March
 Description — The teams of group 3 start their Instant Restaurant round. Colin Fassnidge is joined by the new judge, Darren Robertson, to score and judge this group. At the end of this round, the two lowest scoring teams go to Sudden Death, where one team is eliminated.

Sudden Death Cook-Off 3
 Episode 21
 Airdate — 6 March
 Description — Being the two bottom scoring teams from Round 3, Caitie & Demi and Lama & Sarah will face off in a Sudden Death Cook-Off. The lower scoring team is eliminated.

Top 15

Kitchen HQ: Cookbook Challenge
 Episode 22
 Airdate — 7 March
 Description — The teams must choose recipes to cook out of either Pete or Manu's cookbooks. The top teams from each instant restaurant round were safe and were not required to cook. Then, the rest of the teams were divided into two groups of six. They must memorise the recipes, then cook the dish. The winning team from each group were decided by Pete and Manu and were safe from two eliminations. The bottom teams from each group must cook a dessert, with the team cooking the worst dessert to be eliminated.

Top 14

People's Choice 1: Beach BBQ Challenge
 Episode 23
 Airdate — 8 March
Location — Newport Beach, New South Wales
 Description — The teams cooked a lunch for 200 lifesavers and nippers to say thank you for all their hard work. The food had to be easy to eat on the go. The team with the most votes was People's Choice and was safe from two eliminations. The bottom two teams, decided by and Colin and Pete, have to enter the next Sudden Death Cook-Off.

Sudden Death Cook-Off 4
 Episode 24
 Airdate — 12 March
 Description — As the two weakest teams from the Beach BBQ challenge, Amy & Tyson and Damo & Caz have to compete against each other in a Sudden Death Cook-Off, where one team will be eliminated. The winning team goes through to the Top 13.

Top 13

People's Choice 2: Baking For Bikers Challenge
 Episode 25
 Airdate — 13 March
 Location — Pink Ribbon Motorcycle Ride at Club Marconi, New South Wales
 Description — The teams cooked for the Pink Ribbon Motocycle ride for breast cancer, each team had to raise the most charity money by getting as many bikers to pay for their food. The bikies determined the top team winning Biker's Choice, while the two bottom teams will go to the next Sudden Death elimination.

Sudden Death Cook-Off 5
 Episode 26
 Airdate — 14 March
 Description — As the two weakest teams from the Biker's Challenge, Mark & Chris and Caitie & Demi have to compete against each other in a Sudden Death Cook-Off, where one team will be eliminated. The winning team goes through to the Top 12.

Top 12

People's Choice 3: Canapé Challenge
 Episode 27
 Airdate — 15 March
Location — Carnival Spirit Cruise
 Description — Teams were on board the Carnival Spirit cruise ship to serve canapés for passengers. The passengers tried and voted for their favourite dish, the team with the most votes won Passenger's Choice. Judges Pete and Colin sent the two weakest teams to Sudden Death.

Sudden Death Cook-Off 6
 Episode 28
 Airdate — 19 March
 Description — As the two weakest teams from the Canapé Challenge, Josh & Amy and Kelsey & Amanda have to compete against each other in a Sudden Death Cook-Off, where one team will be eliminated. The winning team goes through to the Top 11. This Sudden Death is also held on board the same ship as the previous challenge.

Top 11

People's Choice 4: Supermarket Sauce Challenge
 Episode 29
 Airdate — 20 March
Location — Coles
 Description — Teams must create a meal and a sauce worth bottling for the grocery buying public. The team with the most votes wins People’s Choice and will have their sauce produced, packaged and sold in Coles supermarkets across Australia and also be safe from the next two eliminations. Pete, Colin and guest judge Curtis Stone will decide the bottom two teams who will face Sudden Death.

Sudden Death Cook-Off 7
 Episode 30
 Airdate — 21 March
 Description — As the two weakest teams from the Supermarket Sauce Challenge, Court & Duncan and Mell & Cyn have to compete against each other in a Sudden Death Cook-Off, where one team will be eliminated. The winning team goes through to the Top 10.

Top 10

People's Choice 5: Street Party Challenge
 Episode 31
 Airdate — 22 March
Location — Eat Street
 Description — Each team cooks out of shipping container kitchens where they set up their original instant restaurants and the customers are the residents on the street. Each resident will eat at any of the restaurants and rate their meal out of ten. The winning team will be safe from this elimination and also gets an advantage at the next challenge.

Sudden Death Cook-Off 8
 Episode 32
 Airdate — 26 March
 Description — As the two weakest teams from the Street Party Challenge, Mark & Chris and Brett & Marie have to compete against each other in a Sudden Death Cook-Off, where one team will be eliminated. The winning team goes through to the Top 9.

Top 9

Kitchen HQ: Finals Fast Track Challenge
 Episode 33
 Airdate — 27 March
 Description — In a three-round challenge, teams competed for the winning prize to head directly into the finals. In the first round, teams were required to plate a dish in just 3 minutes, using one protein and other available ingredients. Tim and Kyle, as their advantage, were able to sit out this round and also determine the order of the other teams plating. The best three teams, along with Tim and Kyle, advanced into the next round where each team cooked a dish in 45 minutes. Each team was allocated the same ingredients for this cook-off. Additionally team members were to cook separately for the first 30 minutes and then rejoin for the remaining 15 minutes to finish. Finally, the best two teams advanced into Round 3 for a luxury ingredient challenge where the winning team advanced straight to the finals. All remaining teams went into an Ultimate Instant Restaurant round.

Ultimate Instant Restaurant
 Episodes 34 to 41
 Airdate — 28 March to 17 April
 Description — With Tim & Kyle through to the finals, the remaining 8 teams headed around the country once again in an Ultimate Instant Restaurant round. All teams have to cook two dishes of each course (entrée, main and dessert) for their fellow contestants and judges for scoring. Guests have a choice of choosing one of the options per course, while the judges Pete and Manu each taste one of the two options. At the end of this round, the lowest scoring team is eliminated.

 Colour Key:
  – Judge's Score for Option 1
  – Judge's Score for Option 2

Top 8

Quarter Final 1: Daily Dining Challenge
 Episode 42
 Airdate — 18 April
 Description — For the start of the Quarter Finals round, the remaining eight teams cooked a breakfast dish against another team, where one was eliminated, based on the scoring of the previous round: i.e. Valerie & Courtney versus Karen & Ros, Della & Tully versus Court & Duncan, David & Betty versus Mark & Chris, and Amy & Tyson against the immunity team, Tim & Kyle. Pete and Manu chose four teams to be safe. The remaining teams cooked a lunch dish and the judges chose the two best teams to be safe. The bottom two teams went into a Sudden Death Cook-Off, where they had to cook a dinner dish. The team that produced the weakest dish was eliminated.

Top 7

Quarter Final 2: Trio Challenge
 Episode 43
 Airdate — 19 April
 Description — The remaining teams chose one type of meat and created three different types of dishes using that particular meat. There were only four types of meat to choose from; beef, lamb, chicken and pork. A maximum of two teams could cook with the same meat. Della and Tully won the advantage from Quarter Final 1 so they got to decide the order in which each team could choose their meat (They chose first, followed by Karen and Ros, Mark and Chris, David and Betty, Valerie and Courtney, Amy and Tyson and Tim and Kyle ). The teams then had 90 minutes to cook their three dishes. The team with the best dish would win an advantage in the next challenge. The two weakest teams went through to Sudden Death to create a Trio of Desserts. The team with the weaker dish would be eliminated.

Top 6

Quarter Final 3: Master the Disaster Challenge
 Episode 44
 Airdate — 23 April
 Description — The six remaining teams faced off in a redemption cook-off. In Round 1, teams were given a second chance to redeem themselves by mastering one of their biggest disasters throughout the competition. The specified dish did not have to be replicated exactly, but needed to have the same fundamentals of their previous dish. Amy and Tyson won the advantage from the previous challenge, and were awarded with 10 more minutes of cooking time compared to the standard 90 minutes. The strongest dish won an advantage in the next challenge, and the two weakest teams faced off in Round 2. They had to cook a dish that best describes them, worthy of a Grand Final. The team with the weaker dish was eliminated.

Top 5

Quarter Final 4: Three Course Challenge
 Episode 45
 Airdate — 24 April
 Description — In order to progress to the Semi-Finals, the five remaining teams faced off in a rapid cook-off. In Round 1, teams had to cook and serve a Three Course Meal within 90 minutes. Tim & Kyle won the advantage from the previous challenge, which granted them with ample time to choose their ingredients from the storeroom without any time constraints. The strongest team won an advantage in the Semi-Finals, being able to compete against a team of their choice. The two weakest teams faced off in Round 2, where they had to cook their "signature dish", worthy of the last spot in the Semi Finals. The team with the weaker dish was eliminated.

Semi-finals

Semi-final 1
 Episode 46
 Airdate — 25 April 
 Description — Amy & Tyson take on David & Betty in the first Semi-Final Cook-Off. The lower scoring team is eliminated and the winner proceeds through to the Grand Final, with a chance of winning the $250,000 prize.

Semi-final 2
 Episode 47
 Airdate — 26 April 
 Description — Valerie & Courtney take on Tim & Kyle in the second Semi-Final Cook-Off. The lower scoring team is eliminated and the winner proceeds through to the Grand Final, with a chance of winning the $250,000 prize.

Grand Final

 Episode 48
 Airdate — 30 April 
 Description — The top two teams face off in the Grand Final. Each team cooks a five course meal, with 20 plates per course, totalling 100 plates of food per team. This is then served to eliminated teams, friends and family. The guest judges return for the final verdict of awarding the $250,000 prize to the winners. The teams also wear proper chef attire and have their Instant Restaurant represented.

Ratings
 Colour Key:
  – Highest Rating
  – Lowest Rating
  – Elimination Episode
  – Finals Week

Notes

References

2017 Australian television seasons
My Kitchen Rules